Tony Ramoin (born 23 December 1988 in Cannes) is a French snowboarder and Olympic athlete who won a bronze medal in snowboard cross at the 2010 Winter Olympics.

References

External links
  Official web site of Tony Ramoin.

1988 births
Living people
French male snowboarders
Sportspeople from Cannes
Snowboarders at the 2010 Winter Olympics
Snowboarders at the 2014 Winter Olympics
Olympic bronze medalists for France
Olympic snowboarders of France
Olympic medalists in snowboarding
Medalists at the 2010 Winter Olympics
Université Savoie-Mont Blanc alumni
Knights of the Ordre national du Mérite
21st-century French people